Gerardo Padilla (born 23 March 1959) is a Mexican judoka. He competed at the 1976 Summer Olympics, 1980 Summer Olympics and the 1984 Summer Olympics.

References

1959 births
Living people
Mexican male judoka
Olympic judoka of Mexico
Judoka at the 1976 Summer Olympics
Judoka at the 1980 Summer Olympics
Judoka at the 1984 Summer Olympics
Place of birth missing (living people)
Pan American Games medalists in judo
Pan American Games gold medalists for Mexico
Pan American Games bronze medalists for Mexico
Judoka at the 1979 Pan American Games
Judoka at the 1983 Pan American Games
Medalists at the 1979 Pan American Games
Medalists at the 1983 Pan American Games
21st-century Mexican people
20th-century Mexican people